Nemanja Perić (born 16 October 1997) is a Serbian footballer.

Career statistics

References

External links
 
 
 

1997 births
Living people
Sportspeople from Požarevac
Association football forwards
Serbian footballers
FK Teleoptik players
FK Borac Čačak players
FK Budućnost Dobanovci players
FK Novi Pazar players
Serbian SuperLiga players
Serbian First League players